The National Guard Special Unit, commonly abbreviated USGN, is the tier 1 police tactical unit (PTU) of the Tunisian National Guard. USGN is trained to rescue citizens and allies who are held by a hostile force domestically or foreign, either criminal or terrorist.

USGN’s purpose is to serve as the Tunisian governments premier counterterrorism unit, offering a tactical resolution option in capture high-value target, clandestine operation, counterinsurgency, counterterrorism, engaging heavily-armed criminals, executive protection, high-risk law enforcement situations, hostage crisis, infiltrating every target areas by sea, air, and land, serving high-risk arrest and search warrants, and VBSS operation. USGN functions as a national SWAT team in highly sensitive or dangerous situations.

History
This 50 man force was established in the early 1980s and is broken down into two operational sections and a headquarters element. Based in Hammamet, they have responsibility for CT operations at government and diplomatic buildings, aircraft hijackings and maritime situations. In the event of a major operation, the U.S.G.N. would be reinforced by the Commandos Unit of the Garde National (National Guard's Commando Unit- U.C.G.N.).

Non-military counterterrorist organizations
Military units and formations of Tunisia
Law enforcement agencies in Africa